Wema Sepetu (born 28 September 1990) is a Tanzanian actress and beauty contestant who won the Miss Tanzania contest in 2006 Miss Tanzania. She represented Tanzania in Miss World 2006, which was held in Poland. She later became an actress in Tanzania.

Early life and education
She hails from the diplomatic family of the Late Abraham Sepetu. She is the last born in a family of four children. She obtained her primary, secondary, and high school education at Academic International School in Dar Es Salaam, Tanzania, and she later joined Limkokwing University of Creative Technology in Malaysia to pursue an international business course which she did for one year and then dropped out to continue with acting.

Miss Tanzania 2006 and Miss World 2006
After winning the title of Miss Tanzania in 2006, Wema traveled to Warsaw, Poland to compete in the Miss World 2006.

Career

Acting 
She was introduced into the movie industry by the late Steven Kanumba during their dating, she made her film debut in A Point of No Return she played Dina, the main character alongside Steven Kanumba, she gave an outstanding performance as young lady who is forced by her family to marry the witch man Lameck (Steven Kanumba) who is not her choice. She later appeared in many movies such as Family Tears, Red Valentine, White Maria that made her to be one of the popular and desired actresses in Tanzania.She has appeared in more than 20 films.
In 2011 she produced the movie called Superstar the film that tells her love life with musician Diamond Platnumz who have been on and off for some period, The movie was launched in 2012 at the Kilimanjaro Hyatt Regency Hotel in Dar Es Salaam and was graced by many people including Omotola Jalade Ekeinde from Nigeria who was the guest of honour. But the movie didn't enter into the market until today and Wema said that she still looking for a best distributor who can pay her compared to her production costs since she stated that most of the distributors have pledged a few money compared to what she invested. After that she appeared in the movies Basilisa, It Was not Me, House boy, Madame, and others.
In 2014 she collaborated with Van Vicker from Ghana to produce a movie called Day After Death starring Wema and Van Vicker. The Film was planned to be released in 2015 but due to some delays it has not entered the market up to today. Apart from D.A.D to not be released. Luckily when celebrating her 30th birthday she did a premier of the movie DAD and now has been a must watch movie. Wema appeared in some movies from 2015 to 2016 such as Family, Mapenzi Yamerogwa and Chungu Cha Tatu among others
In 2017 she made a comeback with her film called Heaven Sent which she produced and act as leading character that has also had Salim Ahmed (Gabo) as the main character, the launch took place at Century Cinemax Mlimani City Dar Es Salaam Tanzania, the movie was sold via her mobile application Wema App, the movie received seven nominations at the 2018 Sinema Zetu International Film Festival Awards including Best Actress and Best Feature Film, where Wema won Best Actress and the movie won People's Choice

Endless Fame Production
In 2013 she launched her company called Endless Fame Production. The company deals with movies production and Artists management, they have managed some of Tanzanian musicians such as Mirror and Ally Luna. The company has produced movies such as Superstar, Unexpected, Day After Death, Family, and Heaven Sent.

Filmography

Movies

Television

Awards and nominations

References

External links

1988 births
Living people
Tanzanian actresses
Tanzanian beauty pageant winners
Miss World 2006 delegates
21st-century Tanzanian actresses